Shackles of Gold is a 1922 American silent drama film directed by Herbert Brenon and starring William Farnum, Alfred Loring, and Marie Shotwell.  It is an adaptation of the 1908 play Samson by Henri Bernstein with the setting moved from France to America. The screenplay involves a woman from an aristocratic but poor family who is pressured by her relatives to marry a wealthy financier.

Plot
As described in a film magazine, John Gibbs (Farnum) is a dock laborer but rises to wealth by speculation in the oil market. He marries Marie (Bonillas), the daughter of Charles Van Dusen (Loring), but she consented to the marriage solely because the family fortune was depleted and to maintain their social standing. John bears this quietly until he learns that his wife has gone to a cabaret with another man. John turns on his former friend, Donald Valentine (Griffin), and, while breaking him becomes, ruins himself. However, through the strange workings of the human mind, he wins the love of his wife.

Cast
 William Farnum as John Gibbs  
 Alfred Loring as Charles Van Dusen
 Marie Shotwell as Mrs. Van Dusen 
 Myrta Bonillas as Marie, Their Daughter  
 Wallace Ray as Harry, Their Son  
 Carlton Griffin as Donald Valentine 
 Ellen Cassidy as Elsie Chandler 
 Henry Carvill as William Hoyt

References

Bibliography
 Goble, Alan.  The Complete Index to Literary Sources in Film. Walter de Gruyter, 1999.

External links

1922 films
1922 drama films
Silent American drama films
Fox Film films
American silent feature films
1920s English-language films
Films directed by Herbert Brenon
American films based on plays
American black-and-white films
1920s American films